Frank Tomiczek (born 30 December 1968), better known as Da Hool, is a German DJ and producer. It was in Bottrop that he first honed his skills as a DJ, and by 1990 was an acclaimed performer in his native country.

Musical career
His early tracks include "B.O.T.T.R.O.P.", "It's a Dream Song", and "Rave Nation". In 1996, he released "Meet Her at the Love Parade", which (when re-released a year later on the German label, Kosmo Records) became a worldwide hit, selling over six million copies. "Meet Her at the Love Parade" reached #15 in the UK Singles Chart in February 1998 (Germany #4, France #4, Netherlands #11, Ireland #7). Further UK charting singles included "Bora Bora" (UK #35, 1998) and "Meet Her at the Love Parade 2001" (UK #11, 2001).

Discography

Singles

References

Living people
German DJs
German house musicians
People from Bottrop
1968 births
Electronic dance music DJs